Ahdid is a small town in Sétif Province of the Kabylie region of Algeria. At the time of the 2004 the town had a total population of 90 people living in 12 households

References

Towns in Algeria
Kabylie
Berber populated places